Robert Jeremy Adam Inch Catto (27 July 1939 – 17 August 2018) was a British historian who was a Rhodes fellow and tutor in Modern History at Oriel College, Oxford, where he was also senior dean. Catto was a Brackenbury Scholar in History at Balliol College, Oxford, where he graduated with first-class honours. He held a master's degree (M.A.) and a doctorate (D.Phil.) From 1964 to 1969 he was employed as a tutor at Hatfield College, Durham. During this time he became acquainted with Mark Lancaster and Bryan Ferry, who were then art students in nearby Newcastle. 

His research interests lay in the politics and religion of later medieval England. In a piece in The Spectator to commemorate his retirement in June 2006, Alan Duncan MP described him as "the quintessential Oxford don ... if one were to devour C. P. Snow, Goodbye, Mr. Chips and Porterhouse Blue, there is a smattering of Catto in each."

He died on 17 August 2018 at the age of 79.

Publications 
 (ed. with T. A. R. Evans), The History of the University of Oxford Volume I: The Early Oxford Schools (28 June 1984) Clarendon Press 
 (ed. with T. A. R. Evans), The History of the University of Oxford Volume II: Late Mediaeval Oxford (17 December 1992) Clarendon Press 
 "The King's Government and the Fall of Pecock 1457–58" in Rulers and Ruled in Late Mediaeval England (ed. R. E. Archer and Simon Walker), (Hambledon, 1995) pp. 201–222
 (ed. with L. Mooney), The Chronicle of John Somer, OFM (Camden Miscellany 34, 1997)
 'Currents of religious thought and expression' in Cambridge Medieval History (ed. M. C. E. Jones), Vol 6 (Cambridge, 2000) pp. 42–65

References

Fellows of Oriel College, Oxford
1939 births
2018 deaths
Alumni of Balliol College, Oxford
Academics of Durham University